Phillip Sami (born 2 August 1997) is an Australian professional rugby league footballer who plays as a er and  for the Gold Coast Titans in the NRL. Sami has also represented his home state, Queensland, in the State of Origin series.

Background
Sami was born in Ipswich, Queensland, to Samoan parents. 

He played his junior rugby league for the Springfield Panthers, Goodna Eagles, and for Eastern Suburbs Tigers. Sami attended Ipswich State High School.

Playing career

Early career
In 2015, Sami played for the Eastern Suburbs Tigers in the Mal Meninga Cup. In 2016 and 2017, he played for the Gold Coast Titans' NYC team.

2017
On 31 May, he was selected in the Queensland under-20 rugby league team.

In round 15 of the 2017 NRL season, Sami made his NRL debut for the Titans against the South Sydney Rabbitohs. In September, he was named at centre in the NYC Team of the Year.

2018
In round 4 of the 2018 season, he scored his first hat-trick of tries against the Brisbane Broncos, with the Gold Coast winning 26-14 at Suncorp Stadium.

2019
In round 23 of the 2019 NRL season, Sami set a new record for the fastest Gold Coast Titans player in history by running 35.9km/hr in a chase-down of Josh Addo-Carr.

Sami made a total of 16 appearances for the Gold Coast in the 2019 NRL season as the club endured a horror year on and off the field.  During the halfway mark of the season, head coach Garth Brennan was sacked by the club after a string of poor results.  The Gold Coast managed to win only 4 games for the entire season and finished last claiming the Wooden Spoon.

2020
Sami started the first five games of the year at fullback under new coach Justin Holbrook due to injuries by AJ Brimson and Tyrone Roberts. 
In round 4, Sami scored the match winning try against Wests Tigers in a 28-23 win from a Brian Kelly kick ending the Gold Coast's 364 day winning drought.
Sami debuted for Queensland in Origin 1 in Adelaide playing on the wing in a 18-14 win. Sami played game 2 as well, however was dropped for Origin 3 following a poor performance in game 2.

2021
Sami played 18 games for the Gold Coast in the 2021 NRL season including the club's elimination final loss against the Sydney Roosters.

2022
Sami played a total of 14 games for the Gold Coast and scored six tries in the 2022 NRL season as the club finished 13th on the table.

References

External links

Gold Coast Titans profile
Titans profile

1997 births
Living people
Australian rugby league players
Australian sportspeople of Samoan descent
Gold Coast Titans players
Queensland Rugby League State of Origin players
Eastern Suburbs Tigers players
Rugby league centres
Rugby league wingers
Rugby league players from Ipswich, Queensland